Waimana Riedlinger-Kapa (born 2 September 1998 in New Zealand) is a New Zealand rugby union player who plays for the  in Super Rugby. His primary playing position is flanker, but he can also play lock. He has signed for the Blues squad in 2020.

Reference list

External links
itsrugby.co.uk profile

1998 births
New Zealand rugby union players
Living people
Rugby union flankers
Rugby union locks
Auckland rugby union players
Blues (Super Rugby) players
Hanazono Kintetsu Liners players